Exostoma sawmteai is a species of sisorid catfish from the Pharsih River, which is a tributary of the Tuivai River in the Barak River drainage in Mizoram, northeast India.

Etymology
The fish is named in honor of Sawmtea Vanalalmalsawma, a field assistant to Lalramliana, who helped collecting specimens.

References

Catfish of Asia
Fish of India
Taxa named by Lalnuntluanga
Taxa named by Heok Hee Ng
Fish described in 2015
Sisoridae